
Year 341 (CCCXLI) was a common year starting on Thursday (link will display the full calendar) of the Julian calendar. At the time, it was known as the Year of the Consulship of Marcellinus and Probinus (or, less frequently, year 1094 ab Urbe condita). The denomination 341 for this year has been used since the early medieval period, when the Anno Domini calendar era became the prevalent method in Europe for naming years or dates.

Events 
 By place 

 Roman Empire 
 Emperor Constans I bans pagan sacrifices and magic rituals, under penalty of death. 
 Constans I begins a successful campaign against the Franks.

 India 
 Samudragupta of the Gupta Empire, during a decade, extends his kingdom and his influence. A pillar found at Allahabad sings his praises.

 By topic 

 Religion 
 The Council of Encaenia is held in Antioch. 
 Paul I is restored as Patriarch of Constantinople.
 Thousands of Christians are executed at Seleucia in Mesopotamia.
 Coptic Christianity is introduced into Ethiopia by the Syrian apostle Frumentius. He and his colleague Edesius were captured by Ethiopians a year or two ago, and have become civil servants at the Aksumite court of King Ezana. Frumentius becomes the first Bishop of Axum and encourages the Christian merchants present in the country to practise their faith openly.

Births 
 Ai of Jin (or Qianling), Chinese emperor (d. 365)

Deaths 
 Asterius of Cappadocia, Christian theologian and writer
 Du Lingyang (or Du Ling), Chinese empress (b. 321)
 Eusebius of Nicomedia, archbishop of Constantinople
 Ge Hong (or Ko Hung), Chinese taoist (approximate date)
 Paul of Thebes, Christian hermit (approximate date)
 Potamon of Heraclea, Christian bishop and martyr

References